Jessica Teixeira Vieira (born 13 November 1991 in Maputo, Mozambique) is a Mozambican swimmer. She competed at the 2012 Summer Olympics in the 50 m freestyle event.

References

External links

Living people
1991 births
Sportspeople from Maputo
Mozambican people of Portuguese descent
Swimmers at the 2012 Summer Olympics
Olympic swimmers of Mozambique
Mozambican female freestyle swimmers